Woodward's Stores Ltd. was a department store chain that operated in Alberta and British Columbia, Canada, for 101 years, before its sale to the Hudson's Bay Company.

History
Charles Woodward established the first Woodward store at the corner of Main and Georgia Streets in Vancouver in 1892. On September 12, 1902, Woodward Department Stores Ltd. was incorporated and a new store was built on the corner of Hastings and Abbott Streets. In 1926 a store was opened in Edmonton and by the late 1940s the company operated numerous stores in British Columbia and Alberta. Stores opened included Victoria in 1945, Port Alberni in 1948, Park Royal Shopping Centre in West Vancouver in 1950, New Westminster in 1954, Westmount Shopper's Park in Edmonton in 1955, Oakridge Centre (where Woodward's was the owner and anchor tenant) in 1959, Chinook Centre in Calgary in 1960, Victoria in 1963, Northgate Mall in Edmonton in 1963, and Prince George and Guildford Town Centre in Surrey in 1966, Southgate Centre in Edmonton in 1970, Mayfair Shopping Centre in Victoria in 1974, Cherry Lane in Penticton in 1975, Sevenoaks in Abbotsford in 1975, Landsdown Park in Richmond in 1977, and Coquitlam Centre in 1979.

Woodward's was a central feature of the retail scene in southwestern British Columbia for much of the twentieth century.  The chain was distinctive in that stores included a large supermarket known as the "Food Floor". At Oakridge Centre and Chinook Centre (Calgary), the Woodward's Food Floor had a conveyor system from the cash registers out to a structure in the parking lot. Upon request, the bag boys would pack customers' groceries into numbered bins and send the bins through the conveyor system. Then customers would take tags with matching numbers out to the structure, and more bag boys would load the groceries from the matching bins into the customers' cars. This service was called the Grocery Parcel Depot in Oakridge and Parcel Pickup in Chinook. When Woodward's sold the Food Floor chain - long known for its quality and its line of unusual specialities - to Safeway, the flagship store’s food floor became a reduced-size IGA supermarket, as Safeway showed no interest in that location. Many western Canadians fondly remember Woodward's famous "$1.49 Day" sales (said aloud as "dollar forty-nine day"), held on the first Tuesday of every month. These sales were advertised widely on radio and in newspapers, including a distinctive jingle used for years after it was introduced in April 1958, and offered everything from canvas-top running shoes to bath oil for the one price.

Most Woodward's locations were converted to Hudson’s Bay or Zellers stores by the end of 1993. Other major retailers took over several stores, and the remaining locations were either closed or were divided into mall retail space.

Woodward's also operated two stand alone Furniture Fair stores in Burnaby (which became Costco's first location in Canada in 1985) and Edmonton in the 1970s. There were also discount type stores called Woodwynn (similar to Winners) in BC and Alberta (some within Woodward's Stores), which were originally known as Woodward's Bargain Stores. Several malls also had separate Woodward's Book Stores. The closure of Woodward's locations in many malls sparked redevelopment and expansion of a number of the centres, such as Chinook Centre in Calgary. In a number of malls, the presence of separate operations such as the book store and Woodwynn required these stores to also be replaced. When the West Edmonton Mall location closed, The Bay - which already had a full store at the opposite end of the mall - simply converted the former Woodward's into a second Bay (one of the few cases where a single mall has had two duplicate anchor tenants); after a few years of this, however, the Woodward's-Bay was closed and converted into a multi-screen movie theatre, an HMV Canada (now Sunrise Records) location, and additional retail space.

On December 8, 2009, the Woodward's Food Floor reopened for the first time since the chain's sale to Safeway. The new Woodward's Food Floor, which is located in Vancouver at the former Woodward's complex (along with a new location of London Drugs), is now a division of Nester's Market.

See also
Woodward's Building
List of Canadian department stores
Spencer's (department store)

References

External links

Hudson's Bay Company website
Woodward's Food Floor website
Footage of survey of Woodward's building in Vancouver and demolition of the tower, 2006, City of Vancouver Archives

Department stores of Canada
Defunct retail companies of Canada
Hudson's Bay Company
Retail companies established in 1892
1892 establishments in British Columbia